"Long Term Parking" is the 64th episode of the HBO original series The Sopranos and the 12th of the show's fifth season. Written by Terence Winter and directed by Tim Van Patten, it originally aired on May 23, 2004.

Starring
 James Gandolfini as Tony Soprano
 Lorraine Bracco as Dr. Jennifer Melfi *
 Edie Falco as Carmela Soprano
 Michael Imperioli as Christopher Moltisanti
 Dominic Chianese as Corrado Soprano Jr. *
 Steven Van Zandt as Silvio Dante
 Tony Sirico as Paulie Gualtieri
 Robert Iler as Anthony Soprano Jr.
 Jamie-Lynn DiScala as Meadow Soprano *
 Drea de Matteo as Adriana La Cerva
 Aida Turturro as Janice Soprano Baccalieri *
 Vincent Curatola as Johnny Sack
 John Ventimiglia as Artie Bucco
 and Steve Buscemi as Tony Blundetto

* = credit only

Guest starring

Synopsis
Little Carmine recoils from the escalating violence of the New York mob war, and Johnny Sack becomes the new boss of the Lupertazzi crime family. In a sit-down with Tony, both Johnny and Phil make threats against his blood relations. Johnny says he wants Tony B "on a fucking spit." Tony B, in hiding, calls Tony to apologize. Tony tells him not to come back and says he will look after his sons. He further admits why he was not at the hijack where Tony B was arrested decades earlier, saying that he has always felt guilty; "Now we're even." Ending the call, they tell each other to take care. Tony has the call traced. His cousin is in upstate New York, near their uncle's now-empty house.

Tony and Johnny meet alone. Tony says he knows where Tony B is, and what has to be done. Johnny refuses to let Tony handle it himself and further refuses to promise that it will be quick. Tony then refuses to give up Tony B's location and the meeting ends in antagonism.

Tony punishes Christopher for bungling a cigarette smuggling operation. Back home, Chris rants about Tony's treatment of him and what he sees as his favoritism towards Tony B. Adriana, stressed, is diagnosed with ulcerative colitis.

When FBI surveillance of Adriana's nightclub catches her behaving oddly with a bag of garbage, she is brought in. She admits that she was cleaning up after a murder in her office: drug dealer Matush Giamona killed a customer who claimed he had been ripped off. Threatened with imprisonment for covering up the murder, Adriana is told she has to wear a wire. She refuses but persuades the FBI that Chris is ready to turn. They let her go, with a deadline for bringing him in.

When Adriana tells Chris she has been talking to the FBI, he reacts violently and begins to strangle her before he breaks down crying. They eventually agree to flee and start a new life. However, while getting gas for his Hummer H2 the next morning, he pensively observes a poor family in front of the gas station, their meager possessions strapped to the roof of a run-down car.

Adriana receives a call from Tony. He tells her that Chris has tried to kill himself but is all right; Silvio will come to take her to the hospital. Instead, he drives her to an area of deserted woodland, turns off the road onto a track, and stops. Adriana knows what’s about to happen. Silvio drags her out of the car. As she crawls away, crying, he shoots and kills her off-screen. Chris dumps a suitcase of her belongings in a riverside dumping ground and puts her car in long-term parking at the airport. At the Bada Bing, Tony sees that Chris is doped on heroin; Chris says the pain is too much. Tony loses control and beats him up, saying Chris is not the only one with pain.

Tony and Carmela negotiate over her desire to build a house on spec in partnership with her father. Tony agrees to pay $600,000 for the land. He promises that his "midlife crisis will no longer intrude anymore" into their marriage. They are reconciled and he moves back in. Tony goes to see Valentina in the hospital and breaks up with her.

Deceased
 Gilbert Nieves: stabbed to death by Matush Giomana (in flashback).
 Adriana La Cerva: shot and killed by Silvio Dante for being an informant to the FBI.

Additionally, Billy Leotardo murder by Tony Blundetto, previously mentioned only, is shown in Phil Leotardo's flashback.

Title reference
 Christopher parks Adriana's car in the "Long Term Parking" section at the airport.
 "Long-term parking" could refer to a long-term decision, or putting oneself in a lasting or binding situation: Adriana suggesting she and Christopher join the Witness Protection Program; Carmela and Tony moving back in together; Tony B.'s attempts to disappear; and Christopher's and Tony's guilt over the death of Adriana.
 The title could refer to the state of Christopher's soul, which could be forever damned for his betrayal of Adriana.
 When Adriana is picked up by the FBI outside the pharmacy, she mentions that her car is still in the parking lot.
In the previous episode, Tony is asked whether he'd like short-term or long-term parking as he arrives at The Plaza hotel.

Production
 To combat leaked storylines, the writers and Chase used to devise fake scenes to confuse the set. The scene in which Adriana was killed was shot in two ways: with her getting away, and with her being shot in the woods.
 Many fans speculated that Adriana had survived because her death was not shown on-screen.  However, Drea de Matteo confirmed in her 2005 DVD commentary that Adriana was indeed killed. De Matteo quotes Van Zandt as saying: "Do [the fans] think I was shooting squirrels?" Later in the DVD commentary, de Matteo talks about the strong fan reaction to Adriana's death.
In 2014, during an "Ask Me Anything" session on Reddit, de Matteo stated: "All of us had known already that my character was dying - [Steven] Van Zandt was actually the most pissed off about it, he didn't want to do it, he just didn't want to do it. And I had to talk him into how awesome it was gonna be and how important it was, he didn't want to pull me out of that car, he didn't want to call me a c-word, he didn't want to shoot me in the head, but David [Chase] made a specific point not to show my character actually getting the bullet to her head. I'm not sure if that was for cliffhangers reasons, but he said it was from respect for the character."
 De Matteo asked David Chase to cut out the scene where Christopher tells Tony about Adriana in order to keep her death at the hands of Silvio a surprise. The scene was later aired in the sixth-season episode "The Ride," as a flashback sequence.

References to other media
 During a conversation with Carmella, Tony mentioned Popeye.
 Christopher's line "The highway's jammed with broken heroes on a last chance power drive" is from Bruce Springsteen's song "Born to Run," a pop culture reference made more apropos by the presence of Steven Van Zandt (as Silvio Dante), longtime guitarist in Springsteen's E Street Band. Van Zandt also sings backing vocals on the "Born To Run" track.
 The scene with Christopher and Adriana where both of them are crying over the consequences of Adriana being an informant, including Chris's strangled wail of "Oh, God, what are we gonna do?!" mirror a similar scene in the 1990 film Goodfellas where Henry and Karen Hill are falling apart at the realization they are in mortal danger from Paulie Cicero and his crew after Henry's narcotics bust.
 The scene with Tony Soprano sitting alone in his backyard reminiscing about his cousin closely resembles the ending scene of The Godfather Part II, in which Michael Corleone sits alone at his Lake Tahoe compound remembering a moment shared with his family.
 Tony watches the film It's a Gift on TV after he moves back in with Carmela.
 The film Christopher is watching at the Bada Bing after admitting to Tony that he snorted some heroin is Three Amigos.

References to past episodes
 The Crazy Horse club and the character Matush were both introduced in "The Telltale Moozadell" in a storyline in which Matush was repeatedly kicked out of the club for dealing drugs on the premises.
 Christopher dumps Adriana's suitcase in the same location where Tony had almost killed him in "Irregular Around the Margins."

Music
 Lou Christie's song "Summer Snow" is playing in Phil Leotardo's flashback of his brother Billy's murder.
 The song playing when Tony enters his Bada Bing office near the end of the episode is "Super Bon Bon" by Soul Coughing.
 The Shawn Smith song, "Leaving California," plays in the background while Silvio drives with Adriana.
 The song playing in Silvio's car when he parks in the woods is "Barracuda" by Heart.
 The song played over the end credits is another song by Shawn Smith, "Wrapped in My Memory," from Shield of Thorns.

Awards
 Terence Winter won the Primetime Emmy Award for Outstanding Writing for a Drama Series for his work on this episode.
 Tim Van Patten was nominated for the Primetime Emmy Award for Outstanding Directing for a Drama Series for his work on this episode.
 Drea de Matteo won the Primetime Emmy Award for Outstanding Supporting Actress in a Drama Series for her performance in this episode.
 Michael Imperioli won the Primetime Emmy Award for Outstanding Supporting Actor in a Drama Series for his performance in this episode.
Empire named "Long Term Parking" the best Sopranos episode of all time.
In 2005, TV Land included this episode as part of its 'Top 100 Most Unexpected Moments in TV History', ranking it #56.

References

External links
"Long Term Parking"  at HBO

The Sopranos (season 5) episodes
2004 American television episodes
Emmy Award-winning episodes
Television episodes directed by Tim Van Patten
Television episodes written by Terence Winter